Kilwa Kisiwani (Kilwa Island) is an island, national historic site, and hamlet community located in the township of Kilwa Masoko, the district seat of Kilwa District in the Tanzanian region of Lindi Region in southern Tanzania. Kilwa Kisiwani is the largest of the nine hamlets in the town Kilwa Masoko and is also the least populated hamlet in the township with less than 1,000 residents. At its peak Kilwa hosted over 10,000 inhabitants in the Middle Ages. Since 1981 the entire island of Kilwa Kisiwani has been designated by UNESCO as a World Heritage Site along with the nearby ruins of  Songo Mnara. Despite its significant historic reputation, Kilwa Kisiwani is still home to a small and resilient community of native residents that have inhabited the island for centuries. Kilwa Kisiwani is one of the seven World Heritage Sites located in Tanzania. Additionally, the site is a registered National Historic Site.

Geography 
Kilwa Kisiwani Island lies exactly at 9 degrees south of the equator. On the west part of the Island is the Mavuji River estuary. On the south part of the Island lies the Sagarungu sound and to the east lies the Indian Ocean.

Economy

The island is located with the Kilwa Masoko township authority. The main economic activities on the island are Cultural tourism, fishing and subsistence agriculture. Economic growth is limited due to limited accessibility to the island. The island has no rivers and the main source for water is wells. Many of the island's freshwater wells have been used for over a millennium. The island is served by small boats to and from the port at Kilwa Masoko. The island's  only electricity is solar based and low capacity. There are no roads on the island thus most transport is on foot or by motorcycle.

To protect the historic integrity of the Island, non-island residents are strictly prohibited from visiting the island without a visitor's permit from the tourist information center in downtown Kilwa Masoko. Much of the historical artifacts and buildings on the island are yet to be unearthed.

Historical Significance of Kilwa Island
Kilwa Kisiwani is also an archaeological Swahili city-state site located along the Swahili Coast on the Kilwa Archipelago. It was occupied by (possibly) Mwera people from the mainland from at least the 8th century CE and eventually became one of the most powerful  Swahili settlements along the East African coast. Historically, it was the center of the Kilwa Sultanate, a medieval Swahili sultanate whose authority at its height in the 13th-15th centuries stretched the entire length of the Swahili Coast. The seasonal wind reversals would affect trade circulations.

In 1331CE, Moroccan traveller and scholar Ibn Battuta visited Kilwa and described it as one of the  beautiful cities of the world. Trade connections with the Arabian Peninsula as well as India and China influenced the growth and development of Kilwa, and, though there are Islamic words and customs that have been adapted to the culture, the origins are African. Many of the Swahili settlements showed complex layouts that reflected social relations between groups, however at Kilwa, there are many questions still left unanswered about the town's layout after the Portuguese burnt it to the ground in July 1505.

The Swahili cemeteries are located on the edge of the town, which is common for the Swahili region, and large, open spaces were likely used for social gatherings. An important city for trade, around the 13th century there were increased fortifications and a greater flow of goods. For these to take place, there would need to be a form of political administration overseeing the city, controlling the movement of goods. Much of the trade network was with the Arabian peninsula. Kilwa Kisiwani reached its highest point in wealth and commerce between the 13th and 15th centuries CE.

Evidence of growth in wealth can be seen with the appearance of stone buildings around the 13th century CE, before which all of the buildings were wattle-and-daub. The socio-economic status of the individuals residing there can be inferred from the type of structure they were living in. Among Kilwa's trade exports were spices, tortoiseshell, coconut oil, ivory, and aromatic gums, as well as gold. At around this time, Kilwa had seized control of the trade of gold at Sofala, Mozambique. The wealthier residents of Kilwa owned exotic textiles and foreign ceramics, though items such as luxury clothes are not preserved in the archaeological record. For approximately 500 years, Kilwa minted its own coins. This lasted from about 1100-1600 CE and the coins have been found across the region, including Great Zimbabwe.

Marine resources were abundant and used for food, supplemented by the surrounding land.  Due to the impact the sea had on Kilwa, including marine resources and trade opportunities, the archaeological investigation of the harbors and ports is considered to be of high importance. The topsoil that covers the limestone at Kilwa was of poor quality, and so food sources on land came from the areas of higher ground. However, the soil in the Kilwa region would have been suitable for growing cotton, which could be used in sail manufacturing. 12th century spindle whorls have been found, indicating that cotton was used and processed in this area.

Ceramics

At first, most of the focus was placed on the archaeology of Kilwa's ports and harbors, however, more and more emphasis is being placed on Kilwa's hinterlands. 
Ceramic artifacts are plentiful at the site and can be divided into two groups: regional and coastal. All of the ceramics with regional distribution were locally produced, but the area of distribution is limited. These unglazed ceramics were referred to as Kitchen Wares, though their uses were not necessarily just as cooking vessels.  All of the varieties of locally produced pottery found in the region were also uncovered at the site of Kilwa itself.

While the Kitchen Wares could be seen throughout the region, there were ceramics that were mostly seen within Kilwa itself. These included modeled forms and red-burnished wares. The distribution pattern of the red-burnished wares was coastal. Other ceramic types that were seemingly restricted to town were the imported ceramic vessels from the Arabian peninsula and China. Imported ceramic materials are not found in rural areas. They were used as a sign of social status by the elite. They were kept in wall niches made just for the purpose of displaying them. These imported ceramics played important symbolic roles along the Swahili Coast. The symbolism attached to the imported ceramics was so strong that it carried on to modern Swahili culture. The lack of imported goods in the hinterlands indicates that, while Kilwa was undergoing a process of urbanization, the other local communities did not undergo a dramatic transformation.

Preservation of the site
In 2004, Kilwa Kisiwani was inscribed on UNESCO's List of World Heritage in Danger. There is a serious rapid deterioration of the archaeological and monumental heritage of these two islands due to various agents like erosion and vegetation. The eastern section of the Palace of Husuni Kubwa, for example, is progressively disappearing. The damage to the soil caused by rainwater wash is accentuating the risks of the collapse of the remaining structures on the edge of the cliff. The vegetation that proliferates on the cliff has limited the progression of the rain-wash effect but causes the break-up of the masonry structures. The World Monuments Fund included Kilwa on its 2008 Watch List of 100 Most Endangered Sites, and since 2008 has been supporting conservation work on various buildings. In 2014 it was removed from the list.

Between 2005 and 2009, the Zamani Project documented some of the Swahili ruins on Kilwa Kisiwani with terrestrial 3D laser scanning. The structures documented include: the Gereza (prison); the Great Mosque; the Husuni Kubwa; the Makutani Building and the Malindi Mosque. Some of the 3D models, a panorama tour, elevations, sections and plans are available on www.zamaniproject.org.

Historic Buildings

Great Mosque

The Great Mosque of Kilwa is a congregational mosque on the island of Kilwa Kisiwani, in Tanzania. It was likely founded in the tenth century, but the two major stages of construction date to the 12th or twelfth and thirteenth century, respectively. It is one of the earliest surviving mosques on the Swahili Coast.

The smaller northern prayer hall dates to the first phase of construction. It contained a total of 16 bays supported by nine pillars, which were originally carved from coral but later replaced by timber. The structure was entirely roofed, and was perhaps one of the first mosques in the area to have been built without a courtyard.

In the early fourteenth century, Sultan al-Hasan ibn Sulaiman, who also built the nearby Palace of Husuni Kubwa, added a southern extension which included a great dome. This dome was described by Ibn Battuta after he visited Kilwa in 1331. You can view a 3D model of the Great Mosque here

Palace of Husuni Kubwa

Husuni Kubwa (the "Great Palace"), situated outside the town, was an early 14th-century sultan's palace and emporium.  Other defining features include causeways and platforms at the entrance of the Harbour made from blocks of reef and coral nearly a meter high. These act as breakwaters, allowing mangroves to grow which is one of the ways the breakwater can be spotted from a distance. Some parts of the causeway are made from the bedrock, but usually the bedrock was used as a base. Coral stone was used to build up the causeways with sand and lime being used to cement the cobbles together. Some of the stones were left loose.

The Palace of Husuni Kubwa is another prominent structure in Kilwa. The majority of the palace was erected in the 14th century by Sultan al-Hasan ibn Sulaiman, who also built an extension to the nearby Great Mosque of Kilwa, although portions may date back to the 13th century. for unknown reasons, the palace was inhabited only for a brief period of time, and abandoned before its completion.

In true Swahili architecture style the structure was built out of coral stone on a high bluff overlooking the Indian Ocean. It consists of three major elements: a south court, used primarily for commerce; a residential complex including over one hundred individual rooms; and a wide stairway leading down to a mosque on the beach.

Other notable features include a pavilion, which likely served as a reception hall, and an octagonal swimming pool. All of Husuni Kubwa spans across approximately two acres. The coral rag was set in limestone mortar and cut stone was used for decorative pieces, door jams, and vaults. The rooms were about 3 meters tall. The roof was made from cut limestone blocks laid across cut timbers and the floors were white plaster. The main entrance to Husuni Kubwa is from the shore.

Most of the imported glazed pottery recovered at the site was Chinese celadon, though there were a few Ying Ch'ing stoneware sherds present, and a Yuan dynasty flask dated to about 1300 CE. Neither the Kilwa Chronicle nor any other Portuguese accounts describe a building comparable to Husuni Kubwa.

Husuni Ndogo
Husuni Ndogo ("Little Palace") is built from coral rubble and limestone mortar. The rectangular enclosure wall surrounds the complex and at each corner stands a tower. The foundations extend two meters below ground level. It appears to have been built as a fort, but the exact purposes and uses are somewhat unknown. There is some evidence that it, for at least a time, was used as a mosque. Architecturally, it appears to be different from other buildings along the coast, resembling buildings constructed under the Caliphs of the Umayyad at around 661-750 CE. However, whether or not the structure is related or even dates to the Arabic buildings remains uncertain, though it seems unlikely.

Gereza Fort 

The Gereza Fort (also called the Arab Fort) is situated between the Makutani Palace and the Great Mosque. There are some evidence that the original structure was Portuguese, while the present form of the fort is of typical Omani forts. The word Gereza means prison in Swahili, possibly indicating the use of the fort as an Omani slave holding building during the late 18th century to late 19th century after the collapse of the Swahili civilization after the arrival of the Portuguese in late 16th century.

Controversies

A lot of Kilwa's history has been written and politicized by Omani and European colonial administrators in the 19th century to justify the occupation and domination of East Africans over the centuries. This view assumes that cultural innovation and historical development in Africa can only come from outside.  Hence there has been a lot of contradictory evidence on the origins and the role of foreign immigrants in Kilwa's history.

According to local oral tradition, in the 11th century the island of Kilwa Kisiwani was sold to Ali bin Hasan, son of the "King" of Shiraz, in Persia. Another tradition relates that his mother was Somali. Ali bin Al-Hasan is credited with founding the island city and with marrying the daughter of the local king. Though he was credited with the founding, he had arrived at an already inhabited area. He did, however, come to power and is credited with fortifying the city and increasing trade. Tradition also relates that it was the child of this union who founded the Kilwa Sultanate. Archaeological and documentary research has revealed that over the next few centuries, Kilwa grew to be a substantial city and the leading commercial entrepôt on the southern half of the Swahili Coast (roughly from the present Tanzanian-Kenya border southward to the mouth of the Zambezi River), trading extensively with states of the Southeast African hinterland as far as Zimbabwe. Trade was mainly in gold, iron, ivory and other animal products of the interior for beads, textiles, jewelry, porcelain and spices from Asia. On the contrary, there is no evidence of Shirazi-based Shia Islam in Kilwa and the entire East African coast.

By the 12th century, under the rule of the Abu'-Mawahib dynasty, Kilwa had become the most powerful city on the Swahili Coast. At the zenith of its power in the 15th century, the Kilwa Sultanate claimed authority over the city-states of Malindi, Mvita (Mombasa), Pemba Island, Zanzibar, Mafia Island, Comoro, Sofala and the trading posts across the channel on Madagascar.

Ibn Battuta recorded his visit to the city around 1331, and commented favorably on the generosity, humility, and religion of its ruler, Sultan al-Hasan ibn Sulaiman. Ibn Battuta also describes how the sultan would go into the interior and raid the people taking slaves and other forms of wealth. He was also particularly impressed by the planning of the city and believed that it was the reason for Kilwa's success along the coast. From this period, the construction of the Palace of Husuni Kubwa and a significant extension to the Great Mosque of Kilwa, which was made of coral stones, the largest mosque of its kind. Kilwa was an important and wealthy city for the trade of gold. Because of trade, some of the people who lived in Kilwa had a higher standard of living, but many others were poor. The wealthy enjoyed indoor plumbing in their stone homes and the poor lived in mud huts with thatched roofs.

In the early 16th century, Vasco da Gama extorted tribute from the wealthy Islamic state. In 1505 another Portuguese force commanded by D. Francisco de Almeida took control of the island after besieging it. It remained in Portuguese hands until 1512, when an Arab mercenary captured Kilwa after the Portuguese abandoned their outpost . The city regained some of its earlier prosperity, but in 1784 was conquered by the Omani rulers of Zanzibar. After the Omani conquest, the French built and manned a fort at the northern tip of the island, but the city itself was abandoned in the 1840s. It was later part of the colony of German East Africa from 1886 to 1918.

Health & Education 
Since the resident island population is less than 1000 people, there is one school, The Lyahi Koranic Middle school. Older students move to the mainland for further education. There are no healthcare facilities on the Island so residents have to take the boat to the mainland to receive healthcare services at either the Masoka Urban Health Center ot the Masoko BAKWATA Dispensary both located in Kilwa Masoko town.

See also
Historic Swahili Settlements
Swahili architecture

References

Further reading
. Volume 1: History and archaeology; Volume 2: The finds.

External links

 Kilwa Kisiwani Site Page from the Aluka Digital Library
World Monuments Fund Project Page for Kilwa
Free resource for tourists on Kilwa
Description of the mosque at ArchNet, including pictures.
Description of the palace at ArchNet; includes photos.

Swahili people
Swahili city-states
Swahili architecture
Archaeological sites in Tanzania
Palaces in Tanzania
Coastal islands of Tanzania
Former Portuguese colonies
World Heritage Sites in Tanzania
Former populated places in Tanzania
Ruins in Tanzania
Tourist attractions in the Lindi Region
Geography of Lindi Region
World Heritage Sites in Danger
8th-century establishments in Africa
Populated places established in the 8th century
Populated places disestablished in the 1840s
Populated places established in 1886
1840s disestablishments in Africa
1886 establishments in German East Africa
1918 disestablishments in German East Africa
Portuguese colonial architecture in Tanzania
Archaeological sites of Eastern Africa
Islands of Lindi Region